Layered Image File Format (LIFF) is a file format used in the Openlab suite for microscope image processing. It is a proprietary format, but has an open, extensible form analogous to TIFF. It was specifically designed to contain a large number of high resolution images, and also all of the meta data generated by analysis of such images.

Apart from being an acronym, the name LIFF was chosen to honour Douglas Adams and John Lloyd's The Meaning of Liff, which was in turn named after Liff, a town in Scotland.

Graphics file formats